The Lac Cardinal Pioneer Village Museum was developed by the Lac Cardinal Pioneer Museum Society which was founded in 1988. It is located within the Lac Cardinal Recreation Area and features four homes, a hall, municipal office, school, barn, pole sheds, church, blacksmith shop, railway station, barbershop, general store and bakery, all furnished, depict pioneering life in this area. Admission is by donation.

The church in the museum is available during the summer for weddings and the hall for family or group activities.

The museum is operates from late May to mid-September from 11 a.m. to 5 p.m. It is run by volunteers.

Events 
Annual Pioneer Day held on the 2nd Saturday in August includes: pancake breakfast, beef on a bun, pies, demonstrations of sawmill, shingle mill, planer, threshing, horse and wagon rides, children's races and musical entertainment.

An old-fashioned Christmas is held in December with a pancake breakfast, wiener roast, hot chocolate and cookies.  Activities include a sliding hill for the children and making of ornaments and tree decorating in the school.  A church service, musical entertainment, and horse and sleigh rides are provided.

In February, in conjunction with the Alberta Pond Hockey Tournament, a Family Day pancake breakfast is held. Other activities provided by the Town of Grimshaw Community Services Board include sleigh rides to the tournament located on the lake, hot chocolate, cookies and the sliding hill

References 

1988 establishments in Alberta
Museums established in 1988
Museums in Alberta
Open-air museums in Canada